David Rhodes (born 12 November 1975) is an Australian sprint canoeist. At the 2004 Summer Olympics, he finished fourth in the K-2 1000 m event.

References
Sports-Reference.com profile

1975 births
Australian male canoeists
Canoeists at the 2004 Summer Olympics
Living people
Olympic canoeists of Australia
Place of birth missing (living people)
21st-century Australian people